Aregh Batur is a farming village in Balkh Province in northern Afghanistan. Situated on the Amu Darya river next to Joi Wakli.

See also 
Balkh Province

References

External links
Satellite map at Maplandia.com

Populated places in Balkh Province